Robert Adam Thompson (May 9, 1860 – 1947) was a merchant, miller and politician in Ontario, Canada. He represented Wentworth North in the Legislative Assembly of Ontario from 1902 to 1908 as a Liberal.

He was born in Beverley Township, Ontario and was educated in Wentworth County schools and at the Canadian Business College in Hamilton. In 1892, Thompson married Agnes A. Black. He served on the Beverley township council for two years and was reeve for two years.

References

External links

1860 births
1947 deaths
Ontario Liberal Party MPPs